Thalloloma janeirense is a rare species of corticolous lichen in the family Graphidaceae. It has been reported from Brazil, Fiji, the Philippines and the Seychelles.

References

Graphidaceae
Lichen species
Lichens described in 2002
Lichens of Brazil
Lichens of Malesia
Fungi of Seychelles